The 1989 Vuelta a Murcia was the fifth edition of the Vuelta a Murcia cycle race and was held on 7 March to 12 March 1989. The race started in Mazarrón and finished in Murcia. The race was won by Marino Alonso.

General classification

References

1989
1989 in road cycling
1989 in Spanish sport
March 1989 sports events in Europe